Tetartopeus is a genus of beetles belonging to the family Staphylinidae.

The species of this genus are found in Europe, Japan and Northern America.

Species:
 Tetartopeus adanensis Assing, 2004 
 Tetartopeus albipes (Lucas & P.H., 1846)

References

Staphylinidae
Staphylinidae genera